Al Batinah is a settlement in Yemen.

Populated places in Hadhramaut Governorate